Gabriel Dossen (born 29 November 1999) is an Irish amateur boxer who won a gold medal at the 2022 European Championships.

Boxing career
Dossen fights out of the southpaw stance. He currently fights under the Olympic Boxing Club in Galway having formerly fought with the Furbo Boxing Club in Spiddal.

Dossen won bronze in the 2016 AIBA Youth World Boxing Championships as a light welterweight and bronze at the 2017 EUBC European Youth Championships. On 30 May 2022, he won middleweight gold at the 2022 European Amateur Boxing Championships in Yerevan, Armenia.

Personal life
Dossen was born in Ivory Coast and moved to Ireland at a young age. He currently lives in the Knocknacarra area of Galway where he works at Tesco and is a business studies student at Technological University of the Shannon: Midlands Midwest.

References

Irish male boxers
1999 births
Living people
Sportspeople from County Galway
Middleweight boxers
Southpaw boxers